Harry Mozart Bendixen (13 October 1901 in Copenhagen – 30 December 1954 in Gentofte) was a Danish football (soccer) player and sports journalist. He played 16 games and scored one goal for the Denmark national football team from 1924 to 1928. In club football, he represented Akademisk Boldklub (AB) during his entire career. As a journalist, Bendixen was sports editor at Berlingske Tidende and later the editor-in-chief of B.T. Harry Bendixen was the author of several popular youth books on different sports. He died of an appendicitis.

Bibliography
Laursen, Valdemar, Poul Jensen and Harry Bendixen, "Tre fra Landsholdet", Gyldendal, 1933.
Bendixen, Harry, "3-0", Frederik E. Pedersen, 1934.
Bendixen, Harry, "6 Dages Løbet", Jespersen og Pio, 1936.
Bendixen, Harry, "I det 89. Minut", Jespersen og Pio, 1937.
Bendixen, Harry, "Færdig - spring!", Jespersen og Pio, 1937.
Bendixen, Harry, "Ringen fri!", Jespersen og Pio, 1939.
Bendixen, Harry, "Alt om Fodbold som det bør spilles.", Copenhagen, 1942.

References

External links
Danish national team profile
 Peders Fodboldstatistik profile

1901 births
1954 deaths
Danish men's footballers
Denmark international footballers
Footballers from Copenhagen
Association football defenders